Line 3 is a north-south line of the Shanghai Metro network. Its older rolling stock carry a bright yellow colour belt to differentiate them from Line 4 trains which share a portion of its route, while the newer stock features a yellow and purple livery, which the exact line is labelled using sticker or screens saying “Line 3” or “Line 4”. The line has about 300 drivers. Between December 26, 2000 and August 8, 2002 the line operated under the name Pearl Line; On August 8, 2002 it was renamed as Rail Transit Line 3. The line is colored yellow on system maps.

History
This line followed the route of historic railway lines Shanghai-Hangzhou Railway Inner Circle Line from Shanghai South Railway Station to Shanghai Railway Station, and Songhu Railway from Baoshan Road station to Jiangwan Town station.

 December 26, 2000: Shanghai South-Jiangwan Town (trial opening)
 August 2001: Shanghai South-Jiangwan Town (official opening)
 January 2004: As part of the Shanghai South reconstruction scheme, Line 3 suspended service at the station, operating between Shilong Road and Jiangwan Town.
 June 10, 2004: Service suspended at Shilong Road, Longcao Road and Caoxi Road for automatic signal system testing and restoration of land subsidence at these three stations. Service was restored at these stations on July 24.
 October 15, 2005: Service to Shanghai South Railway Station was restored after the completion of the reconstruction scheme.
 December 18, 2006: Line 3 was extended from Jiangwan Town  further north to Jiangyang North Road, providing rapid transit service to neighbourhoods in Baoshan, as well as to the Baosteel Group Corporation.

In October 2006, according to a new naming scheme, East Wenshui Road station was renamed Dabaishu station. The scheme stressed naming stations after existing toponyms, sights and attractions (if any) rather than simply after neighbouring vertical streets, making it easier for visitors to find these places. In this particular case, the renaming aimed also to eliminate possible confusion between Wenshui East Road and Wenshui Road, a newer station of line 1. However, in a more recent case, the same type of confusion occurred at West Yingao Road station of line 3 and East Yingao Road station of line 10.

Stations

Service routes

Important stations
 The northern terminus.
 Baoshan Town is located near this station.
 Baoyang Road Ferry Terminal is located nearby.
 This station is located at Wusong Town, with a memorial for the Songhu Railway, which was constructed in the 1890s along the route of China's first railway, the Woosung Road
 The Jiangwan Town offices are nearby this station.
 Located near the residence of Shanghai Shenhua Football Club.
 Interchange with line 4. A Virtual interchange with line 1 is also present.
 Interchange with lines 2 and 4.
 Interchange with lines 4 and 9.
 Interchange with lines 1 and 15.

Headways 
Because it shares tracks with line 4, line 3 operates on a comparatively looser schedule, with an average interval of around 7 minutes (5 minutes in the peak hours). However, riders can expect a 2-minute train interval at any one of the shared-line stations during rush hour. To avoid confusion, line 3 trains have the number 3 painted on the sides of trains, and line 4 trains the number 4. During trail operation, headways were 30 minutes, reduced to 15 minutes in September 2001. The line was extremely popular with 15,000 passengers on the first day and 30,000 after three day.

Not all trains serve the whole line. Because Baoshan District is largely suburban, some trains stop service at Changjiang South Road, while others continue to Jiangyang North Road, the northernmost station. Therefore, service between Changjiang South Road and Jiangyang North Road operates on a 10-to-12-minute basis, compared to the rest of the line which operates on a 5-to-7-minute basis. An LED screen in front of a train will indicate its terminal station, in addition to the station broadcast and the arrival board.

Because line 3 is elevated, transferring to other underground stations typically takes more walking. In-system transfer has been introduced to all interchange stations except Shanghai Railway Station (where lines 3 and 4 meets line 1). Virtual interchange is offered at both stations for Public Transportation Card holders.

<onlyinclude>

Technology

Signaling
Lines 3 and 4 has been operating over capacity due to large passenger flows for a number of years. With the continuous extensions of operating time, the problems of aging equipment and increasing passenger demand will further increase the operating pressure of the two lines. In June 2021 it was announced that Shanghai Metro has started to update of the signal system of lines 3 and 4 and finish before December 31, 2024.
These are the last lines in the system that are equipped with fixed block Alstom URBALISTM 200 system, not equipped with CBTC systems capable of headways as low as 90 seconds. CASCO successfully won the bid for the renewal and transformation of the signaling for lines 3 and 4 using its self-developed Qiji TACS system.

Rolling Stock

References 

Shanghai Metro lines
 
Railway lines opened in 2000
2000 establishments in China
1500 V DC railway electrification